Vitreous may refer to:

Materials
 Glass, an amorphous solid material
 Vitreous enamel, a material made by fusing powdered glass to a substrate by firing
 Vitreous lustre, a glassy luster or sheen on a mineral surface

Biology
 Vitreous body, a clear gel that fills the space between the lens and the retina in vertebrate eyes
 Vitreous membrane, a layer of collagen separating the vitreous body from the rest of the eye

See also
 Vitrification, the transformation of a substance into a glass